Jeffrey Leo Patterson (3 November 1928 – 28 April 2013) was a boxer, Australian rules footballer who played with South Melbourne, Richmond and Fitzroy in the Victorian Football League (VFL) and event promoter.

Early life
Born in the great depression, Patterson was abandoned on a doorstep the day he was born, being taken in by the family that owned the bootmaker's shop where he was found. After the death of his adoptive father, he was in and out of boys' homes for truancy.

Football
Patterson originally started his football career with Maldon, then spent one season with Castlemaine before being recruited by South Melbourne. Between 1951 and 1954, he played a total of 41 games with South Melbourne, Richmond and Fitzroy, before moving to Tasmania. He then played with Cornwall (later known as East Launceston) in the Northern Tasmania Football Association for six seasons. He also played seven games for the Tasmanian State team.

Promoter
Patterson fled Launceston in 1960, leaving large debts, but remade himself in Europe, involved with famous acts such as the Everly Brothers, Sammy Davis jnr, Roy Orbison, Fats Domino and Edith Piaf. He also had dealings with the likes of the infamous Kray twins.

Notes

External links 

Jeff Patterson's boxing record from boxerlist

1928 births
2013 deaths
Australian rules footballers from Victoria (Australia)
Sydney Swans players
Richmond Football Club players
Fitzroy Football Club players
Castlemaine Football Club players
East Launceston Football Club players